Hannah Fleming (born 3 October 1991 in Dumfries) is a Scottish curler from Lockerbie. She is a former World junior champion skip.

Career

Youth
Fleming began her junior career by winning a gold medal at the 2009 European Youth Olympic Winter Festival, playing third for the Scottish team, skipped by Anna Sloan.

Fleming skipped Scotland at two straight World Junior Curling Championships. At the 2012 World Junior Curling Championships, she led her rink of Lauren Gray, Alice Spence and Abi Brown to a 7-2 round robin record. In the playoffs, they knocked off the Czechs (skip: Zuzana Hajkova) twice to claim the gold medal. At the 2013 World Junior Curling Championships, Fleming led her rink of Gray, Jennifer Dodds and Brown to an 8-1 round robin record. In the playoffs, they beat the Japanese team (skip: Sayaka Yoshimura) in the 1 vs. 2 game, but lost in the final to Team Russia, skipped by Alina Kovaleva.

Fleming capped off her youth career by skipping her Edinburgh Napier University team at the 2013 Winter Universiade with teammates Gray, Dodds and Spence. The team would finish the round robin with a 6-3 record, but lost both their playoff matches, settling for fourth place.

Women's
Fleming was invited to play alternate for Scotland (skipped by Kerry Barr) at the 2014 Ford World Women's Curling Championship. The team finished a disappointing 11th place, with Fleming losing all four games she played in.

Fleming played third for Scotland at the 2014 European Mixed Curling Championship on a team skipped by Kyle Smith. They would finish fourth.

After finishing runners-up at the Scottish Women's Curling Championship (often to Eve Muirhead) for many years, Fleming and her rink of Dodds, Spence and Vicky Wright finally won the Muirhead-less 2018 Scottish championship. The team had to playoff against Muirhead, who was absent at the Olympics in order to qualify for the 2018 Ford World Women's Curling Championship. The team upset the fatigued Muirhead rink in two straight games in the best of three playoff in order to play in the World championships.

Personal life
Fleming is employed as an estate agent.

References

External links
 

1991 births
Living people
Scottish female curlers
People from Lockerbie
Sportspeople from Dumfries
Alumni of Edinburgh Napier University